The Battle of Sarıkamış was a conflict between the First Republic of Armenia and the Eastern Front of the Army of the Grand National Assembly of Turkey which was on September 29, 1920, at Sarıkamış.

Background

In late September 1920 the Armenians initiated several attacks against Turkish forces in the area. On 24 September an Armenian force of at least 800 men, supported with nine machine guns, began an unsuccessful attack against the weak Turkish entrenchments in Bardız Şenkaya. The attack was repulsed and cost them 47 killed and several wounded. Additionally, two machine guns and ammunition were captured by the Turks. The Turks suffered eight killed and ten wounded during the attack. These attacks gave the Turkish commanders an insight into Armenian military capabilities.

Active Stage
The Turkish forces quickly defeated the Armenian troops in the town. The remaining Armenian forces retreated to the Kötek-Selim-Göle line and stayed there until 30 September.

Results
By September 29, Karabekir's forces had retaken Sarıkamış and the following day Kağızman.

References

Conflicts in 1920
Battles of the Turkish–Armenian War
1920 in Armenia
1920 in the Ottoman Empire
History of Kars Province
September 1920 events